John Leeuwerik (born 19 June 1959) is a Dutch former footballer who played as a midfielder.

Career

Leeuwerik started his career with Dutch second tier side De Graafschap, where he made 423 appearances and scored 113 goals, helping them earn promotion to the Dutch top flight.

References

External links
 

1959 births
Association football midfielders
De Graafschap players
Dutch footballers
Eerste Divisie players
Eredivisie players
Living people